PSR B1257+12 b, alternatively designated PSR B1257+12 A, also named Draugr, is an extrasolar planet approximately  away in the constellation of Virgo. The planet is the innermost object orbiting the pulsar PSR B1257+12, making it a pulsar planet in the dead stellar system. It is about twice as massive as the Moon, and is listed as the least massive planet (with the mass accurately determined) known, including among the planets in the Solar System.

Nomenclature

The convention that arose for designating pulsars was that of using the letters PSR (Pulsating Source of Radio) followed by the pulsar's right ascension and degrees of declination. The modern convention prefixes the older numbers with a B meaning the coordinates are for the 1950.0 epoch. All new pulsars have a J indicating 2000.0 coordinates and also have declination including minutes. Pulsars that were discovered before 1993 tend to retain their B names rather than use their J names, but all pulsars have a J name that provides more precise coordinates of its location in the sky.

On its discovery, the planet was designated PSR 1257+12 A and later PSR B1257+12 A. It was discovered before the convention that extrasolar planets receive designations consisting of the star's name followed by lower-case Roman letters starting from "b" was established. However, it is listed under the latter convention on astronomical databases such as SIMBAD and the Extrasolar Planets Encyclopedia. Hence the designation PSR B1257+12 b.

In July 2014 the International Astronomical Union launched NameExoWorlds, a process for giving proper names to certain exoplanets and their host stars. The process involved public nomination and voting for the new names. In December 2015, the IAU announced the winning name was Draugr for this planet. The winning name was submitted by the Planetarium Südtirol Alto Adige in Karneid, Italy. Draugr are undead creatures in Norse mythology.

References

External links
 
 Pulsar Planets

Exoplanets detected by timing
Exoplanets discovered in 1994
Exoplanets with proper names
Pulsar planets
Science and technology in Poland
Terrestrial planets
Virgo (constellation)